Love on the Rocks is a 2004 Hong Kong romantic comedy film directed by Dante Lam and Chan Hing-ka. The film stars Louis Koo and Gigi Leung, with special appearances by Charlene Choi and Donnie Yen.

Cast
 Louis Koo as Wong Kai-Ming
 Gigi Leung as Annie
 Charlene Choi as Crystal Yeung
 Donnie Yen as Victor Tsui
 Rain Li as May
 Kathy Chow Man-kei as Judy 
 Cheuk Wan-chi Barbie
 Alex Fong Lik-Sun as Policeman
 Chan Fai-hung as Danny
 Benz Hui as Annie's dad
 Gillian Chung as Mandy
 Carl Ng as Ray
 Raymond Leung as Mr. Lee
 Uncle Ba as Danny's uncle
 Chan Man-lei as Mr. Lee
 Ng Choi-yuk as Suki
 Terence Tsui as On Bak
 Poon An-ying as Mrs. Lee
 Chan Hung as Mrs. Lee's son
 Lau Ka-wan as Waitress
 William Chow as Ken
 Lam Siu-cham as Victors' mom
 Cheng Ka-fai as Mandy's friend

External links 
 
 HK Cinemagic entry

2004 films
2004 romantic comedy films
Hong Kong romantic comedy films
China Star Entertainment Group films
2000s Cantonese-language films
Films directed by Dante Lam
Films set in Hong Kong
Films shot in Hong Kong
2000s Hong Kong films